Clavus moquinianus is a species of sea snail in the family Drilliidae.

Description
The length of the shell attains 12 mm, its diameter 4.5 mm. The fusiform shell had an acuminate spire. It shows 9 flattened whorls with shallow sutures, however the penultimate whorl is subconvex..The 2 whorls of the protoconch are white and smooth. The shell is obliquely longitudinally costate, the costae fading towards the upper part and the base of the body whorl, with close revolving lines. The interior of the oval body whorl is white. The outer lip is sharp. The columellar lip has a fairly thick callus, The anal sinus is moderate and rounded. The wide siphonal canal is very short and slightly recurved. The columella is rather straight. The color of the shell isyellowish white, marked with chestnut, and with also scarcely apparent lines of chestnut

Distribution
This marine species occurs off New Caledonia.

References

  Kilburn R.N., Fedosov A. & Kantor Yu.I. (2014) The shallow-water New Caledonia Drilliidae of genus Clavus Montfort, 1810 (Mollusca: Gastropoda: Conoidea). Zootaxa 3818(1): 1–69

External links

moquinianus
Gastropods described in 1874